The Batwing Spaceshot is a thrill ride located at Warner Bros. Movie World on the Gold Coast, Australia. It opened on 20 December 2006. The ride is an S&S Space Shot, a pneumatic powered ride which shoots riders up and then back down. It carries 360 passengers per hour, and lasts for 50 seconds. The ride opened almost one year after the opening of the Superman Escape roller coaster, which opened on 26 December 2005. The logo is similar to The Dark Knight logo. However, The ride has no other similarity to The Dark Knight.

History
First signs of construction were seen in the middle of 2006 when the queue for the former Looney Tunes Musical Revue show was demolished. This was followed by the excavation of ground in the area. In July 2006, it was confirmed that the ride would be a S&S Power Space Shot. The ride was later announced to be a Batman themed space shot tower called Batwing Spaceshot. On 20 December 2006, the ride opened to the public. The ride was installed by Ride Entertainment Group.

References

External links
 

Drop tower rides
Warner Bros. Movie World
Amusement rides manufactured by S&S – Sansei Technologies
Amusement rides introduced in 2006
Towers completed in 2006
Batman in amusement parks
2006 establishments in Australia
Warner Bros. Global Brands and Experiences attractions